Baron Gaetano Ventimiglia (1888-1973) was an Italian cinematographer who worked in the Italian and British film industries during the silent era. di Ventimiglia collaborated three times with Alfred Hitchcock. He was a descendant of the House of Ventimiglia.

Selected filmography
 Theodora, the Slave Princess (1921)
 The Pleasure Garden (1925)
 Venetian Lovers (1925)
 The City of Temptation (1925)
 The Mountain Eagle (1926)
 The Lodger (1927)
 A Woman in Pawn (1927)
 The Physician (1928)
 Sailors Don't Care (1928)
 Smashing Through (1929)

Bibliography
 Mcgilligan, Patrick. Alfred Hitchcock: A Life in Darkness and Light. HarperCollins, 2004.
 Gottlieb, Sidney & Brookhouse, Christopher. Framing Hitchcock: Selected Essays from the Hitchock Annual. Wayne State University Press, 2002.

External links

1888 births
1973 deaths
Italian cinematographers
Film people from Catania
House of Ventimiglia